Glidden is a hamlet in the Rural Municipality of Newcombe No. 260, Saskatchewan, Canada. In 2001 the community had a population of 40 people. It previously held the status of village until October 19, 2000.

History
Glidden is named after Charles Glidden (an immigrant from Paw Paw, Michigan) who sold the townsite to the Canadian Pacific Railway. Prior to October 19, 2000, Glidden was incorporated as a village, and was restructured as a hamlet under the jurisdiction of the Rural municipality of Newcombe on that date.

See also

List of communities in Saskatchewan
Hamlets of Saskatchewan

References

Newcombe No. 260, Saskatchewan
Former villages in Saskatchewan
Unincorporated communities in Saskatchewan
Populated places disestablished in 2000